New Zealand singer-songwriter Lorde has released three studio albums, four extended plays, 11 singles and nine music videos. At the age of 13, she was signed to Universal Music Group (UMG) and started to write music. In November 2012, when she was 16 years old, she self-released The Love Club EP via SoundCloud. It was released for sale by UMG in March 2013; a song from the EP, "Royals", topped numerous single charts internationally, including the US Billboard Hot 100. The track sold over 10 million units worldwide, making it one of the best-selling singles of all-time.

Later that year, Lorde released her debut studio album Pure Heroine, which included "Royals". It charted at number one in New Zealand and Australia, and achieved certifications in several countries. As of June 2021, the album has sold over six million copies worldwide. It was preceded by three additional singles: "Tennis Court", "Team", and "Glory and Gore". "Team" was a top-ten hit in several single charts, including Canada and the United States. The following year, Lorde recorded four songs for the soundtrack album of the 2014 film The Hunger Games: Mockingjay, Part 1, including the single "Yellow Flicker Beat".

Her second studio album, Melodrama, was released in June 2017, and topped the charts in four countries, including the United States. It yielded three singles: "Green Light", "Perfect Places" and a remix of "Homemade Dynamite" featuring Khalid, SZA and Post Malone. The former was a top-ten hit in Australia and Canada.

Albums

Studio albums

Soundtrack albums

Extended plays

Singles

As lead artist

As featured artist

Promotional singles

Other charted songs

Other appearances
The following songs are not singles or promotional singles and have not appeared on an album by Lorde:

Songwriting credits

Music videos

Footnotes

References

External links
 Official website
 Lorde at AllMusic
 

Discography
Discographies of Croatian artists
Discographies of New Zealand artists
Electronic music discographies
Pop music discographies
Rock music discographies